Achille Bacher (27 April 1900 – 2 March 1972) was an Italian cross-country skier. He competed in the men's 18 kilometre event at the 1924 Winter Olympics.

References

External links
 

1900 births
1972 deaths
Italian male cross-country skiers
Olympic cross-country skiers of Italy
Cross-country skiers at the 1924 Winter Olympics
Sportspeople from the Province of Verbano-Cusio-Ossola